Thiruvananthapuram North railway station  (also known as Kochuveli railway station) (station code: KCVL) is a satellite passenger railway terminus of Thiruvananthapuram city in the Indian state of Kerala. The Kochuveli railway station is located towards the north of the city, approximately at a distance of 8 kilometers from Thiruvananthapuram city. The Kochuveli railway station is located near to NH-66 Thiruvananthapuram City bypass.

The railway station was opened in 2005. The station has two entrances, eastern side and western side. The eastern side has the satellite terminal from where the trains originating from Kochuveli operate and the old railway station is situated on the western side. Currently, 16 long-distance express trains and one passenger train operate from the station. Kochuveli railway station connects passengers to important cities of India.

Some trains presently operating from Thiruvananthapuram Central, including the Sabari Express, will commence the journey from Kochuveli railway station once the station is completely developed. Kochuveli railway station also caters to special trains during busy seasons. The trains connect this station to cities like Amritsar, Chandigarh, Dehradun, Secunderabad, Hubli, Bengaluru, Mangaluru, Mysuru, Madgaon, Bhavnagar, Mumbai, Ahmedabad, Indore, Surat, Nilambur, Jodhpur, Sri Ganganagar and Nagercoil.

Facilities
One Foot Overbridge with elevator facility on PF4.
Computerised Reservation Ticket Counter
Computerised Unreserved Ticket Counter
Public Address System

Accessibility
The station is situated 1.2 km from the NH 66 Trivandrum–Kanyakumari bypass road and 8 km from Central bus station Thiruvananthapuram. Kerala State Road Transport Corporation operates a low-floor AC feeder bus from  Kochuveli terminal to Trivandrum city for the benefit of long-distance passengers. The buses are operated from the station at timings based on train arrivals. The nearest bus stop on the NH 66 Kazhakoottam–Kovalam bypass road is World Market Junction from where commuters can use the Kerala State Road Transport Corporation buses towards various places in Trivandrum city and Kazhakoottam.

Future developments at Kochuveli terminal
A pedestrian overbridge connecting platforms on the eastern and the western sides is long-awaited. Platforms 2 and 3 are now fully operational. Kochuveli, the satellite terminal of Thiruvananthapuram, is also poised for growth, with the present six platforms and a total of ten once fully developed. The coach care centre, which is undergoing construction, is yet to be completed. Construction of a sickline complex and two pit lines is in progress.

See also
 
 
 Transport in Thiruvananthapuram
 
 Chennai Central

References

External links
Indian Railways official website

Railway stations in Thiruvananthapuram
Railway stations opened in 2005
Thiruvananthapuram railway division